C/2020 F3 (NEOWISE) or Comet NEOWISE is a long period comet with a near-parabolic orbit discovered on March 27, 2020, by astronomers during the NEOWISE mission of the Wide-field Infrared Survey Explorer (WISE) space telescope.

NEOWISE is known for being the brightest comet in the northern hemisphere since Comet Hale–Bopp in 1997. It was widely photographed by professional and amateur observers and was even spotted by people living near city centers and areas with light pollution. While it was too close to the Sun to be observed at perihelion, it emerged from perihelion around magnitude 0.5 to 1, making it bright enough to be visible to the naked eye. Under dark skies, it could be seen with the naked eye and remained visible to the naked eye throughout July 2020. By July 30, the comet was about magnitude 5, when binoculars were required near urban areas to locate the comet. 

For observers in the northern hemisphere, the comet could be seen on the northwestern horizon, below the Big Dipper. North of 45 degrees north, the comet was visible all night in mid-July 2020. On July 30, Comet NEOWISE entered the constellation of Coma Berenices, below the bright star Arcturus.

History and observations 

The object was discovered by a team using the WISE space telescope under the NEOWISE program on March 27, 2020. It was classified as a comet on March 31 and named after NEOWISE on April 1. It has the systematic designation C/2020 F3, indicating a non-periodic comet which was the third discovered in the second half of March 2020.

This passage through the planetary region increases the comet's orbital period from about 4400 years to about 6700 years. Its closest approach to Earth occurred on July 23, 2020, 01:09 UT, at a distance of  while located in the constellation of Ursa Major.

In early July, the comet could be seen in the morning sky just above the north-eastern horizon and below Capella. Seen from Earth, the comet was less than 20 degrees from the Sun between June 11 and July 9, 2020.

By early July, Comet NEOWISE had brightened to magnitude 1, far exceeding the brightness attained by previous comets that year, C/2020 F8 (SWAN), and C/2019 Y4 (ATLAS). By July, it also had developed a second tail. The first tail was blue and made of gas and ions. There was also a red separation in the tail caused by high amounts of sodium. The second twin tail was a golden color and was made of dust, like the tail of Comet Hale–Bopp. The comet was brighter than C/2011 L4 (PanSTARRS), but not as bright as Hale–Bopp was in 1997. After perihelion, the comet began to fade, dropping to magnitude 2 in mid July. Its nucleus activity subdued after mid-July, and its green coma was clearly visible after that.

On July 13, 2020, a sodium tail was confirmed by the Planetary Science Institute's Input/Output facility. Sodium tails have only been observed in very bright comets such as Hale–Bopp and C/2012 S1 (ISON).

The nucleus is similar in size to Comet Hyakutake and many short-period comets such as 2P/Encke, 7P/Pons-Winnecke, 8P/Tuttle, 14P/Wolf, and 19P/Borrelly. Later in July 2020, other observations were also reported, including those related to coma morphology and spectrographic emissions. On 31 July 2020, strong detection of OH 18-cm emission was observed in radio spectroscopic studies at the Arecibo Observatory. On August 14, 2020, the rotation period of the comet was reported to be "7.58 +/- 0.03 hr". 

A number of authors have suggested considering the comet a great comet. Others have argued that it lacked the brightness and visible tail to qualify.

Trajectory 

Comet NEOWISE retrograde orbit crossed to the north of the plane of the ecliptic, to which it is inclined at approximately 129 degrees, on June 29, 2020, 01:47 UT. This passage increases the comet's orbital period from about 4400 years to about 6700 years. On July 18, the comet peaked at a northern declination of +48 and was circumpolar down to latitude 42N. Its closest approach to Earth occurred on July 23, 2020, 01:09 UT, at a distance of  while located in the constellation of Ursa Major.

Gallery 
In chronological order:

See also

 Lists of comets

References

External links 

 C/2020 F3 (NEOWISE) – Comet Watch
 C/2020 F3 (NEOWISE)  – AiM-Project-Group
 C/2020 F3 (NEOWISE) – Ernesto Guido & Adriano Valvasori
 Comet C/2020 F3 (NEOWISE) Information & Planetarium – TheSkyLive
  – ISS view (video; 7:00; July 7, 2020)
  – Tom Polakis; 300w rms/20mins (video; 0:10; July 7, 2020)
 C/2020 F3 (NEOWISE) – Seiichi Yoshida
 C/2020 F3 (NEOWISE) photo gallery - Mathew Browne
 

Astronomical objects discovered in 2020
Comets in 2020
Articles containing video clips